Edmonton South was a federal electoral district in Alberta, Canada, that was represented in the House of Commons of Canada from 1979 to 1988.

This riding was created in 1976 from parts of Edmonton West and Pembina ridings.

It was abolished in 1987 when it was redistributed into Edmonton Southwest and Edmonton—Strathcona ridings.

Election results

See also 
 Edmonton South provincial electoral district.
 List of Canadian federal electoral districts
 Past Canadian electoral districts

External links

Former federal electoral districts of Alberta